Bhanda Nanna Ganda (Kannada: ಭಂಡ ನನ್ನ ಗಂಡ) is a 1992 Indian Kannada film directed by Raj Kishor. In this film Jaggesh played his first lead role, and sung his first song ′Anthintha Gandu Nanalla′ in his career.

Cast
 Jaggesh as Krishna 
 Priyanka as Pramila 
 Ambareesh
 Anjali Sudhakar
Honnavalli krishna 
Kulla Shantharaj 
Killer Venkatesh as Madan 
Thriller Manju 
Komal Kumar 
A. T. Raghu 
Paapamma 
Ashalatha 
Adugodi Srinivas 
Bank Janardhan

Soundtrack 
"Anthintha Gandu Naanalla" - Jaggesh
"O Mahila Manigale" - Jaggesh, Chandrika
"Preethiya Theranu" - L. N. Shastri, Manjula Gururaj
"Yaarigu Endigu Anjade" - L. N. Shastri

References

External links
On Youtube

1992 films
1990s Kannada-language films
Films scored by V. Manohar